The International Crisis Behavior (ICB) Project is a project that collates interstate crisis data from 1918 (the end of World War I) onward to 2017. The project was created in 1975 by Michael Brecher and Jonathan Wilkenfeld.

Data

The International Crisis Behavior project contains data on international crises from 1918 onward (i.e., after the end of World War I) until a few years ago. As of January 2022, the newest available data is ICB Version 11, released in February 2016. The data for this version extends till 2017 and includes 487 international crises and 1,078 crisis actors. All data is available freely for download.

Reception

Academic reception

Data from the ICB has been referenced in a number of academic papers studying the patterns of conflicts and international crises. It was also used in Chapter 3 of the book What Do We Know About War? edited by John A. Vasquez. The Forecasting Principles website lists the ICB Project as an important data resource in the analysis of conflict and terror.

References

External links

Political databases